The Beatton River is a tributary of the Peace River, flowing generally east, then south through north-eastern British Columbia, Canada. The river meanders mostly through the boreal forest and muskeg of the Peace Plain. Its major tributaries are the Doig and Blueberry Rivers.

The area around the river is the homeland of the Dane-zaa or Beaver First Nation.  Archaeologists have found evidence of human habitation in the area dating back at least 10,000 years.  The mouth of the Beatton River was the location of a Northwest Company fort established in 1806.  Modern-day British Columbia's first European settlement was fur trading Rocky Mountain Fort, established in 1794 at the mouth of the Moberly River near the present Fort St. John.  The river became an important route for First Nations people in their trading relationship with the Europeans.  The present community of Fort St. John is west of the Beatton.

The river, originally called the "North Pine" is named for Frank Beaton (1863–1944), the manager of the Hudson's Bay Company post in the early twentieth century, who homesteaded by the river.  Beaton spelled his name with one "t" but the river is now spelled Beatton.

External links
Beatton River Provincial Park is located at the confluence of the Beatton and Peace Rivers.
The History of Fort St. John provides this excellent history of First Nations habitation along the Beatton River.
Frank Beatton:  The Bridge Between Fur and Farm offers insight into the life of the man for whom the river is named, and the transitional history of the region in the early twentieth century.

Rivers of British Columbia
Dane-zaa
Peace River Country
Peace River Regional District